The NSB Class 49, nicknamed  ("the Dovre Giant"), locomotives were 2-8-4 steam locomotives used to pull heavy trains on the Dovre Line. It is the largest type of steam locomotive in the history of the Norwegian State Railways.

The engines came in three series, the 49a, 49b and 49c. Between 1935 and 1941 five engines were produced by Hamar & Thune, two by Krupp AG. In addition to the seven engines delivered, there were seven engines which were destroyed by a bombing raid during World War II while under construction in Germany, another four were under construction at Thune but were never completed. The engines were retired from service during 1957, stored and finally written off on December 16, 1958 due to dieselization of the Dovre Line.

The numbers of the Dovregubben locomotives were 463, 464, 465, 470, 471, 472 and 473. Engine no. 470 is on display at the Norwegian Railway Museum in Hamar.

Specifications
Length:
a-series: 
b-series: 
c-series: 
Weight of engine:
a-series: 
b-series: 
c-series: 
Weight of tender:
a-series: 
b-series: 
c-series:

See also
2-8-4-engines of Norway

References

Jernbane.net entry on Class 49 (in Norwegian)

Class 49
Class 49
1′D2′ h4v locomotives
Steam locomotives of Norway
Railway locomotives introduced in 1935
Standard gauge locomotives of Norway
Four-cylinder compound steam locomotives